Marine Scout Bombing Squadron 343 (VMSB-343) was a dive bomber squadron of the United States Marine Corps.  Nicknamed “Gregory's Gorilla's”, they were active during World War II but saw limited action due to being assigned to fly anti-submarine patrols from Midway Atoll for their only deployed tour.  The squadron later took part in the occupation of Northern China after the war and returned to the United States to be decommissioned on June 10, 1946.  To date, no other Marine Corps squadron has carried the lineage and honors of VMSB-343.

History

Formation & training
Marine Scout Bombing Squadron 343 was commissioned at Marine Corps Auxiliary Airfield  Atlantic, North Carolina on August 1, 1943.  The squadron transferred to Marine Corps Outlying Field Greenville on December 1, 1943 and trained there until July 15, 1944 when the squadron boarded trains bound for the West Coast.  The squadron departed Marine Corps Air Station Miramar on August 31, 1944 onboard the  bound for Marine Corps Air Station Ewa, Hawaii.

Midway
On October 27 the squadron's Curtiss SB2C Helldivers began the 1,100 mile flight to Midway Atoll stopping to refuel at French Frigate Shoals en route. The flight crews flew via Curtiss R5Cs. The squadron operated off of Eastern Island providing anti-submarine patrols as part of the Hawaiian Sea Frontier. In April 1945 the squadron transferred to Sand Island where they would remain until the end of the war.

Northern China
After returning to Hawaii many of the original members of VMSB-343 rotated home. The squadron was reformed with the addition of numerous personnel from VMSB-241 that were also rotating back through Hawaii. During the voyage the ship endured Tyohoon Louise off the coast of Okinawa. The Arneb arrived at Jiaozhou Bay, Tsingtao where the squadron unloaded and began operations at Tsang Kou Airfield, a former Japanese Airfield. The squadron began flying show-of-strength patrols on November 1, 1945. On December 8, Marine Aircraft Group 32 was tasked to fly an aerial show of strength over the Shantung Peninsula on the anniversary of the attack on Pearl Harbor. Six of the squadron's twelve aircraft got caught in a blinding snowstorm flying beneath the clouds on the return to Tsingtao and crashed near Pingdu. Only two of the twelve squadron personnel involved in this flight survived, and two of the bodies were never recovered.

The ship arrived at San Francisco on June 2, 1946. The squadron was decommissioned on June 10, 1946.

Commanding Officers
The following officers commanded VMSB-343: 
 Major Walter E. Gregory - August 1, 1943 - August 2, 1945
 Major Harold G. Schlendering - August 3, 1945 - August 17, 1945
 Major Perry H. Aliff - August 18, 1945 - August 30 - 1945
 Major Jack Cosley - August 31, 1945 - January 10, 1946
 Major Louis R. Buff - January 11, 1946 - May 16, 1946
 Major W. F. Cornell - May 18, 1946 - June 10, 1946

Unit awards
Since the beginning of World War II, the United States military has honored various units for extraordinary heroism or outstanding non-combat service.  The following are the known awards that VMSB-343 earned during their time in active service.

See also 
 United States Marine Corps Aviation
 List of active United States Marine Corps aircraft squadrons
 List of decommissioned United States Marine Corps aircraft squadrons

Notes

References

Books

Inactive units of the United States Marine Corps